Dearham is a village and civil parish in the Allerdale district of Cumbria, historically part of Cumberland, near the Lake District National Park in England.

According to the 2001 census it had a population of 2,028, increasing to 2,151 at the 2011 Census.

Etymology
'Dearham' is an Old Anglian compound of 'dēor' and 'hām'.
Old Anglian is Old English. 'Dēor' means 'deer', 'hām' is 'homestead' or 'village' or 'estate'.

History
With its resources of coal and easy access to railways, Dearham is part of Cumberland's former coal mining industry. It saw its population increase from 515 in 1821 to 2,598 in 1891 due to the expansion of coal mining. However, with the decline of deep mining and, later, open cast working, the coal industry ceased to be a source of employment in the area.

Historically, Dearham was in the Workington division of the County of Cumberland, in the ward of Allerdale below Derwent. It belonged to the Derwent Petty sessional division, Cockermouth Union and the County Court district of Cockermouth and Workington.

The village also belongs to the rural deanery of Maryport, the Archdeacon of West Cumberland and the Diocese of Carlisle.

Governance
Dearham is part of the Workington constituency for UK parliament. The current Member of Parliament for the Workington constituency is Mark Jenkinson, who is a member of the Conservative Party. The Labour Party has won the seat in the constituency in every general election since 1979. The Conservative Party has only been elected once in Workington since World War II, at the  1976 Workington by-election.

For the European Parliament residents in Dearham voted to elect MEP's for the North West England constituency before Brexit in 2020.

For Local Government purposes it is in the Ellen & Gilcrux Ward of Allerdale Borough Council and the Dearham and Broughton Division of Cumbria County Council.

Dearham has its own Parish Council; Dearham Parish Council.

Education
The village has a primary school with approximately 253 children on roll and a nursery with approximately 26 children on roll.

The majority of young people in Dearham attend Netherhall School, Maryport,  Cockermouth School, Cockermouth and Keswick School, Keswick for their secondary schooling.

St Mungo's Church

St Mungo's Church, was erected in the early 12th century, is a building of stone, with 13th-century chancel, nave, south porch and a 14th-century Pele tower.

During restoration work carried out on the church in 1882, two stones were discovered:-
The first is the  Adam Stone, which depicts the Fall and Redemption of man and dates from 900 AD; 
The second is the Kenneth Cross, which depicts the legend of the 6th-century hermit, St. Kenneth/ Cenydd.

Dearham railway station

Dearham railway station (not to be confused with Dearham Bridge railway station) was on the single track Derwent Branch of the Maryport and Carlisle Railway (M&CR) in the then county of Cumberland, now Cumbria, England.

The station was opened in 1867, situated on the south eastern edge of Dearham towards Crosby. The service through the station survived until 1935.

The Smith crime syndicate
The Smith crime syndicate, were originally based in nearby Aspatria, they are now primarily based in Dearham.

Notable people
Alvin Ackerley, professional rugby league footballer. 
Harry Archer, professional rugby league footballer.
William Slater Calverley, vicar.
John Cuthbertson, instrument maker.
John Osmaston, owner of the Dearham Colliery.

See also

Listed buildings in Dearham

References

External links 

 Cumbria County History Trust: Dearham (nb: provisional research only – see Talk page)
GENUKI(tm) page

 
Villages in Cumbria
Allerdale
Civil parishes in Cumbria